Zhuhai City Polytechnic is located in China Guangdong Province Zhuhai City Xihu Chengqu Jinwan District, at the previous Zhuhai Institute of Education, Zhuhai University of Radio and Television (Zhuhai Electric University, Zhuhai Open University), Zhuhai City Polytechnic School, Zhuhai City Finance and Trade School (Zhuhai Business School) merged in 2004, mainly for industry education. There are more than 16,000 students in the school. The school covers an area of 360,000 square meters, construction area of 88,000 square meters.  Zhuhai City Polytechnic Profile China Broadcasting Network

Departments 
 Electronic Information Engineering
 Mechanical and Electrical Engineering
 School of Aeronautics and Ocean Engineering
 School of Economics and Management
 School of Tourism Management
 College of Humanities and Social Management
 School of Industrial and Art Design
 International Institute for International Cooperation and Exchange

References

External links 
 Zhuhai City Polytechnic official website

Education in China